Palmodes dimidiatus is a species of thread-waisted wasp in the family Sphecidae.

References

Articles created by Qbugbot
Insects described in 1773
Sphecidae
Taxa named by Charles De Geer